Tyagun is a rural locality (a station) and the administrative center of Tyagunsky Selsoviet, Zarinsky District, Altai Krai, Russia. The population was 1,926 as of 2013. There are 40 streets.

Geography 
Tyagun is located 52 km southeast of Zarinsk (the district's administrative centre) by road. Kytmanushka is the nearest rural locality.

References 

Rural localities in Zarinsky District